Chen Jiagen (1939 – 13 December 2011) was a Chinese footballer who played as a forward for the Chinese national football team. He also coached the nation's under-20 side for short spells in 1977 and 1978.

Career statistics

International

International goals
Scores and results list China's goal tally first.

Managerial statistics

References

1939 births
2011 deaths
Chinese footballers
China international footballers
Association football forwards